XHHCU-TDT is a television station in Mexico City, broadcasting on UHF channel 45. The station received its permit in 2010 and signed on July 16, 2015, as the first over-the-air outlet of the Canal del Congreso.

History
As early as 1999, when the Canal del Congreso was being launched, Congress looked into the possibility of putting it on broadcast television.

Congress did not begin to build out the station until January 2012, when it signed a pact with Canal 22 under which Canal 22 would provide technical infrastructure and services to XHHCU. The arrangement would generate considerable cost savings. XHHCU-TDT's transmitter was located on the XEIMT-TV/TDT tower until 2018.

In early 2014, the station was still not on the air, though it began testing in April. The final delay, as of May 2014, was negotiations with the borough of Gustavo A. Madero to install a transmitter on Cerro del Chiquihuite. The Congress eventually planned to sign on additional broadcast transmitters to extend Canal del Congreso's over-the-air reach; however, the primary avenue of broadcast expansion has since been changed to SPR transmitters.

Ultimately, XHHCU, after years of planning, came to air with Canal del Congreso programming on July 16, 2015; the station formally launched on August 6, 2015.

In 2016, Congress received its own land parcel on Cerro del Chiquihuite which will allow it to stop renting space and equipment from Canal 22. The new transmitter facility and tower was dedicated on March 7, 2018. In June 2018, the IFT approved the frequency channel change of XHHCU-TDT to physical channel 18, which was carried out on September 7 of that year. The station kept its nationwide assigned virtual channel, 45.1.

Digital subchannels 
The station's digital channel is multiplexed:

References

External links 
 Official website

Television stations in Mexico City
Public television in Mexico
Spanish-language television stations in Mexico